Ahmet Muhtar Gün (born 4 June 1959, Sarıkamış) is a Turkish diplomat and current permanent representative of Turkey to United Nations Vienna Office.

Education and career 
Gün graduated from Galatasaray High School and studied international relations at Ankara University. He started his career in Turkish Ministry of Foreign Affairs in 1986 and after various positions he became the ambassador of Turkey to Saudi Arabia in 2010. He is currently the permanent representative of Turkey to United Nations Vienna Office since 20 February 2018.

References 

21st-century Turkish diplomats
1959 births
Living people
Galatasaray High School alumni
Ankara University Faculty of Political Sciences alumni
Ambassadors of Turkey to Saudi Arabia